Aribert Heymann (9 December 1898 – 1946) was a German field hockey player who competed in the 1928 Summer Olympics. He was a member of the German field hockey team, which won the bronze medal. He played one match as halfback.

External links
 
Aribert Heymann's profile at databaseOlympics
Aribert Heymann's profile at Sports Reference.com

1898 births
1946 deaths
German male field hockey players
Olympic field hockey players of Germany
Field hockey players at the 1928 Summer Olympics
Olympic bronze medalists for Germany
Olympic medalists in field hockey
Medalists at the 1928 Summer Olympics